Karalar is a neighborhood of İnegöl district in Bursa Province, Turkey.

Geography 
It is 52 km from Bursa city center and 7 km from İnegöl.

Population

References 

Villages in İnegöl District